Turkey 2021 Summer Deaflympics competed in the event fielding 121 athletes.

Medal table

Medalists

References

External links
Turkey at the Deaflympics

2022 in Turkish sport
Turkey at the Deaflympics
Nations at the 2021 Summer Deaflympics